Kanakasooriya Cinkaiariyan (died 1478) was the first of the Aryacakravarti dynasty kings of Jaffna Kingdom to lose complete power to a rival king. He inherited the throne from his father Gunaveera Cinkaiariyan in 1440. He was deposed in 1450 by Sapumal Kumaraya a military leader sent by Parakramabâhu VI from the rival Kotte Kingdom in the south. Number of primary sources such as Rajavaliya and Kokila Sandesa written in Sinhalese vividly describe the planning and conquest of the Jaffna Kingdom.

Kanakasooriya escaped to Madurai in South India with his two sons. Sapumal Kumaraya ruled Jaffna Kingdom as a sub king and even minted coins in the tradition of Setu coins, the native coins of Jaffna Kingdom. After the death of Parakramabahu VI in 1467, he left Nallur the capital he had rebuilt to Kotte to participate in a struggle to inherit the throne. Although he was victorious and ruled as Srisangabodhi Bhuvanekabhahu, he was unable to prevent Kanakasooriya Cinkaiariyan and his two son's return from Madurai with mercenaries to wrest the Jaffna Kingdom from Kotte's over lordship.

Notes

References

1478 deaths
Kings of Jaffna
Sri Lankan Hindus
Sri Lankan Tamil royalty
Year of birth unknown
15th-century monarchs in Asia